David R. Hopkins (May 24, 1938December 16, 2017) was an American engineer, businessman, and Republican politician.  He served two years in the Wisconsin State Assembly, representing Chippewa County.

Biography
Born in Belmont, Massachusetts, Hopkins graduated from Belmont High School and went on to the University of Massachusetts, where he earned his bachelor's degree in chemical engineering.  His work as an engineer brought him to Wisconsin, where he was employed first at Johnson Plastics Machinery, and then co-founded Extrusion Dies, Inc.

He became involved with the Republican Party of Wisconsin and was an officer in The Conservative Caucus.  In 1978, he ran what was considered to be a longshot campaign for Wisconsin State Assembly, challenging incumbent Democrat Steven C. Brist.  He won a narrow 317 vote victory in the general election, taking 51% of the vote.  He went on to win reelection in 1980, but was defeated in a rematch with Brist in 1982, after the implementation of a court-ordered redistricting plan.

Shortly after the 1982 election, he relocated to Florida with his family and founded Complex, Inc., in St. Augustine, Florida.  He remained there for the rest of his life.

Personal life and family
Hopkins married Gloria Ann Burris in 1962.  They had three children together.

David R. Hopkins died in St. Augustine in December 2017.

Electoral history

Wisconsin Assembly, 67th district (1978, 1980)

| colspan="6" style="text-align:center;background-color: #e9e9e9;"| General Election, November 7, 1978

| colspan="6" style="text-align:center;background-color: #e9e9e9;"| General Election, November 4, 1980

Wisconsin Assembly, 55th district (1982)

| colspan="6" style="text-align:center;background-color: #e9e9e9;"| General Election, November 2, 1982

References

External links
  Hopkins, David R. 1938 at Wisconsin Historical Society

1938 births
2017 deaths
People from Belmont, Wisconsin
People from Chippewa County, Wisconsin
People from St. Augustine, Florida
University of Massachusetts alumni
Republican Party members of the Wisconsin State Assembly
20th-century American politicians